Nepean Bay Conservation Park is a protected area in the Australian state of South Australia on Kangaroo Island. It was dedicated in 1974 for the protection of flora and fauna, and is the only reserved area of coastal sandplain on the island.

Description
Its vegetation is mostly an open scrub of Eucalyptus diversifolia and Callitris preissii with areas of low shrubland, tussock sedgeland and Allocasuarina verticillata low open forest over a deep soil of calcareous sands. Other significant plant species include Melaleuca halmaturorum, Acacia sophorae and Leucopogon parviflorus. There is a nesting colony of fairy terns on the coast adjacent to the conservation park. tammar wallabies are common.

The conservation park is classified as an IUCN Category III protected area.

References

External links
Entry for Nepean Bay Conservation Park on protected planet

Protected areas of Kangaroo Island
Conservation parks of South Australia
1974 establishments in Australia
Protected areas established in 1974